Scratch or Stitch is an album by Melt-Banana. This album was the first breakthrough for the band, as well as their first actual U.S. release. LP versions of this album were limited to 2,600 copies, housed in rubber packaging with a poster lyric sheet and a special Melt-Banana temporary tattoo.

The album was recorded in July–August 1995 by Jim O'Rourke and produced by Steve Albini. This along with a US tour with Mr. Bungle helped establish Melt-Banana as one of the leading new Japanese punk rock bands. Melt-Banana have said in interviews how the audience would scream "We want to see Mr. Bungle", "Freebird" and "Go back to Japan", showing how unknown they were at that time.

The track list is filled with Melt-Banana live favorites such as "Plot in a Pot", "Scratch or Stitch", "Sick Zip Everywhere", "It's in the Pillcase", "His Name is Mickey" and "Iguana in Trouble". A promotional video was made for "Sick Zip Everywhere".

Track listing

References

1995 albums
Melt-Banana albums
Skin Graft Records albums
Albums produced by Steve Albini